Ma Zhan’ao (1830–1886) was a Chinese Muslim General who defected to the Qing Dynasty in 1872 during the Dungan revolt along with his General Ma Qianling and General Ma Haiyan who served under him during the revolt. He first sent Ma Chun (Ma Jun) to negotiate a surrender with General Zuo, but Zuo suspected a ruse. Ma then sent his son, Ma Anliang, to negotiate. He then assisted General Zuo Zongtang in crushing the rebel Muslims. In 1877 he and Ma Qianling expelled Muslim rebels who refused to give up from the hills surrounding Hezhou. He had three sons, Ma Anliang, Ma Guoliang, and Ma Suiliang (Ma Sui-liang) 馬遂良. The escape of Han people from Hezhou during the rebellion was assisted by Ma Zhan'ao.

References

19th-century Chinese people
1830 births
1886 deaths
People from Linxia
Hui people
Chinese Muslim generals
Qing dynasty generals
Naqshbandi order
Chinese Sufis
Generals from Gansu